Jacob Denner (1681 – 1735) was a woodwind instrument maker of Nuremberg.

He was the son of Johann Christoph Denner, improver of the chalumeau and credited with the invention of the clarinet. Jacob is also well known for his recorders which have become the model for many modern instruments.  He is reported to have worked for the Medici court in Florence in 1708.

Jacob was also a performer and member of the Nuremberg Stadtpfeiferei.

References

External links
Jacob Denner
The clarinet history
Jacob Denner - All Things Denner

Recorder makers
German musical instrument makers
Musicians from Nuremberg
1681 births
1735 deaths